Ascot Vale was an electoral district of the Legislative Assembly in the Australian state of Victoria.

Ascot Vale was created in the 1955 electoral district redistribution; several districts, including Electoral district of Essendon, were abolished in 1955. The district of Essendon was re-created in 1958 and Ascot Vale abolished. Ascot Vale was then re-created in 1976 after several districts, including Electoral district of Moonee Ponds were abolished that year.

Members

Election results

References

Former electoral districts of Victoria (Australia)
1955 establishments in Australia
1958 disestablishments in Australia
1976 establishments in Australia
1985 disestablishments in Australia